Unterwegs is the third studio album by German recording artist Yvonne Catterfeld, released by Sony Music on 14 March 2005 in German-speaking Europe.

Track listing

Charts

Weekly charts

Year-end charts

Release history

References

External links
 YvonneCatterfeld.com — official site

2005 albums
Yvonne Catterfeld albums